David Thompson Secondary School is a public secondary school located in the Fraserview neighbourhood of Central Vancouver. It had opened in 1958. It is located in between Killarney Secondary School and Sir Winston Churchill Secondary School.

The school served as a filming location for various films in the Twilight Saga.

History
David Thompson Secondary School opened in 1958. During the first year, 1500 students were enrolled and the first graduating class was in 1960. Gradually, the number increased until the mid-seventies where the average annual population was in excess of two thousand. In 1967 and 1968 the Sr Boys basketball teams were the lower mainland champions.

Filming at Thompson
In the spring of 2009, the second installment to The Twilight Saga, New Moon, was filmed at David Thompson. David Thompson was used as the set for Forks High School. In the summer of 2009, the third installment of The Twilight Saga film series, Eclipse'', was also filmed at David Thompson.

Notable alumni
 Annie Liu, Hong Kong Actress
 Kayi Cheung, Miss Hong Kong 2007
 Hargurnek Sandhu, 2 time Olympic field hockey player in 1984 and 1988 games, and assistant coach for 2008 Beijing games
 Dan Kesa, former professional ice hockey player
 Megan Wing, former Olympic figure skater
 Sasha Lakovic, graduate of 1990, former professional ice hockey and roller hockey player
 Laurie Shong, graduate of 1989, former Olympic fencer and pentathlete
 Ronald Deibert, graduate of 1982, professor and director of the University of Toronto's Citizen Lab
 Andrea Jin, graduate of 2014, Juno Award-winning comedian

References

External links
Vancouver School Board - David Thompson
Vancouver School Board
The Tempest School Newspaper

High schools in Vancouver
Educational institutions established in 1958
1958 establishments in British Columbia